Tariq Hisny, simply known and credited as Tariq, is a Sri Lankan composer and singer, working mainly for the Indian music industry.

Early life and education
Tariq was born in Puttalam, North Western Province of Sri Lanka. From a young age, he had shown promise as a singer. During his early days, he used to sing songs as a karaoke artist. He also developed an interest in composing music. He has acknowledged Yuvan Shankar Raja, AR Rahman and Karthik as his inspirations.

Tariq learned Carnatic music, western music theory and piano.

Compositions
In 2016, Tariq began composing music. The same year, he released his first album titled, Izhaar-e-Ishq. He worked with playback singer Yazin Nizar for a song “Bin Tere” in this album, which has been featured in Indian subcontinent and Middle East countries among the youth soon after the release.

In 2017, Tariq released his first Tamil song "Hey Penne" in collaboration with Sathyaprakash.

In 2019, Tariq began working for soundtracks and background scores.

In 2023, Tariq has composed a soundtrack "Turkey-Syria Earthquake 2023" for non-profit organization GlobalGiving to help earthquake hit Turkey and Syria.

Discography

As composer

As singer

References

External links 

 
 
 Tariq Hisny on Spotify

1990 births
Living people
21st-century classical composers
21st-century Sri Lankan male singers
Sri Lankan composers
Sri Lankan record producers
People from Puttalam